US Post Office-Jackson Heights Station is a historic post office building located at Jackson Heights in Queens County, New York, United States. The original section was built in 1936–1937, and was designed by architect Benjamin C. Flournoy (1876-ca. 1939) as a consultant to the Office of the Supervising Architect.  The original section is a symmetrically massed one story brick building with a nine bay wide principal facade in the Colonial Revival style.  It features a three bay entrance pavilion with four simple brick Doric order pilasters which support a limestone triangular pediment.  The building was extended four bays to the east in 1964.  The interior features a 1940 mural by Peppino Mangravite depicting scenes from the history of Jackson Heights.

It was listed on the National Register of Historic Places in 1988.

References
 

Jackson Heights
Government buildings completed in 1936
Colonial Revival architecture in New York City
Government buildings in Queens, New York
Jackson Heights, Queens
National Register of Historic Places in Queens, New York